Adrian Choat (born 20 November 1997 in New Zealand) is a New Zealand rugby union player who plays for the  in Super Rugby. His playing position is flanker. He was announced in the Blues side for Round 1 of the 2021 Super Rugby Aotearoa season. He was also a member of the  2020 Mitre 10 Cup squad.

Reference list

External links
itsrugby.co.uk profile

1997 births
New Zealand rugby union players
Living people
Rugby union flankers
Auckland rugby union players
Bristol Bears players
Blues (Super Rugby) players